Bis-oxadiazole, or more formally known as bis(1,2,4-oxadiazole)bis(methylene) dinitrate, is a nitrated heterocyclic compound of the oxadiazole family.

Bis-oxadiazole is related to bis-isoxazole tetranitrate (BITN), which was developed at the United States Army Research Laboratory (ARL). With a high nitrogen content, these compounds are poised to release a large volume of very stable N2. It is a “melt-cast” explosive material that is potentially both more powerful and environmentally friendly alternative to TNT.

Synthesis 
Glyoxal condenses with hydroxylamine to yield diaminoglyoxime (DAG). Treating DAG with methyl glycolate in the presence of base at high temperature yields bis(1,2,4-oxadiazole).

Replacement for TNT 
TNT is attractive explosive because it is a melt-castable. A low melting point of about 80 °C and high decomposition temperature of 295 °C allows manufacturers to safely pour TNT into molds. The production of TNT generates hazardous waste, e.g. red water and pink water.

Bis-oxadiazole, which is also melt-castable, is about 1.5 times more powerful than TNT and yet produces less hazardous wastes.

A major challenge in the production of bis-oxadiazole is its low yield.

References 

Military technology
Explosive chemicals
Oxadiazoles